Vajrapoha Falls (also Vajrapoya waterfalls), a waterfall in the Belgaum district of Karnataka in India, is situated about in the mountainous forest  in south west direction from the village of Jamboti. The falls are about 1.5 hours southwest of Belgaum.

The Mandovi River (also called the Mahadayi River) is fed by streams near the villages of Gavali, Hemmadaga, Jamboti, Kankumbi, and Talawade villages. During the summer months (March–May) the stream and river water levels can become low.

References

External links
 The Mahaday (Mandovi) River in Karnataka, lovely area photos, including the Vajrapoha Falls.
 Tracing a hidden waterfall
 Diamond droplets and rainbow screens
 Photos
 

Waterfalls of Karnataka
Geography of Belagavi district
Tourist attractions in Belagavi district